Peterson Icefalls is a line of icefalls at the terminus of Stevenson Glacier, where the latter enters the east part of Amery Ice Shelf. Delineated in 1952 by John H. Roscoe from aerial photographs taken by U.S. Navy Operation Highjump (1946–47). Named by Roscoe for J.C. Peterson, Jr., air crewman on Operation Highjump photographic flights in the area.

Icefalls of Antarctica
Bodies of ice of Princess Elizabeth Land
Ingrid Christensen Coast